Christopher "Cris" Kirkwood (born October 22, 1960) is an American musician who is the bassist and a founding member of the Meat Puppets, an alternative punk rock band.

Biography
Raised in Paradise Valley, Arizona, Cris took up the banjo after seeing Deliverance, moved on to guitar, and ultimately picked up the bass when he started playing together in bands with his older brother Curt. In 1980 the brothers and their friend Derrick Bostrom, a drummer, decided to form a band, which they eventually named the Meat Puppets. 

Besides playing bass Kirkwood's role in the band grew over the years to include singing and songwriting. The Meat Puppets songs that Cris has been credited with co-penning have included the majority of the group's self-titled debut, as well as "Maiden's Milk," "Animal Kingdom," "She's Hot," "Other Kinds of Love," "Not Swimming Ground," and "The Mighty Zero," "Paradise," "Bad Love," "Automatic Mojo," and "I Can't Be Counted On," while being solely credited for penning the tracks (which he also sang lead on) "Station," "Evil Love," "Cobbler," and "Inflatable."

Kirkwood's use of drugs began to spin out of control after the success of 1994's Too High to Die, and he developed a severe heroin addiction. Kirkwood retreated to his house in Tempe, Arizona, where he and his wife, Michelle Tardif, who was also an addict, lived in virtual isolation. Tardif eventually died of a drug overdose in August 1998. After the release of the album No Joke! in 1995, Kirkwood's compulsive behavior during what was already a stressful time for the band led to the Meat Puppets entering a period of inactivity. Despite numerous interventions and rehab stays, Kirkwood remained addicted to narcotics for many years.

Imprisonment
In December 2003, Kirkwood got into an argument with a woman over a parking space at a post office in downtown Phoenix. A security guard got involved in the scuffle, which escalated when Kirkwood grabbed the guard's baton and began striking at him. The guard drew his handgun and shot Kirkwood in the back, resulting in his being hospitalized. In August 2004, Kirkwood pleaded guilty to assault with a deadly weapon and was sentenced to 21 months in prison. 

While incarcerated at Federal Correctional Institution in Phoenix, Kirkwood met Jerry Posin, who had been a drummer for Steppenwolf, and joined in Posin's exercise routine. The two eventually joined in jazz and other original music performances at the facility. Kirkwood's time in prison, which he said "was actually pretty tolerable", helped him kick his drug addiction cold turkey. However, no recordings of Kirkwood's jail band performances are known to exist. He served out his time and was released on July 7, 2005.

Return to the Meat Puppets

In April 2006, Billboard announced that Cris and Curt Kirkwood would be recording again as the Meat Puppets. Curt said the brothers planned to release an epic album of "big Meat Puppets stuff", followed by a tour. The original drummer, Derrick Bostrom, was replaced by drummer Ted Marcus.

"I haven't seen my brother since like 1998, but I'm talking to him a lot," Curt was quoted as saying. "He's [been] clean for more than two years and he's all raring to go. Cris' resurrection is no less than miraculous – it's like a Lazarus-type thing. I was just like, 'If Cris is back, I know his frame of mind.' If he's upright and walking, it's hard to knock him down." Cris appeared on the Meat Puppets' first post-reunion album Rise to Your Knees (2007) and its three follow-up records Sewn Together (2009), Lollipop (2011) and Rat Farm (2013).

In 2015, he launched his own self-titled podcast, The Cris Kirkwood Podcast. On July 10, 2015, Kirkwood appeared on Ken Reid's TV Guidance Counselor Podcast. In 2016, Cris either produced and/or played with the following artists for Slope Records – The Exterminators, the Linecutters, and Sad Kid.

Personal life
Kirkwood is a grandson of Carl W. Renstrom, who was owner of Tip-Top Products and a multi-millionaire from Omaha, Nebraska.

Discography

References

1960 births
20th-century American guitarists
Living people
American people convicted of assault
American punk rock musicians
American rock bass guitarists
American male bass guitarists
Meat Puppets members
People from Paradise Valley, Arizona
People from Tempe, Arizona
Prisoners and detainees of the United States federal government
Musicians from Phoenix, Arizona
Guitarists from Arizona
American male guitarists
American shooting survivors